The Parker Pen Company is a French manufacturer of luxury writing pens, founded in 1888 by George Safford Parker in Janesville, Wisconsin, United States.  In 2011 the Parker factory at Newhaven, East Sussex, England, was closed, and its production transferred to Nantes, France.

History
George Safford Parker, the founder, had previously been a sales agent for the John Holland Gold Pen Company. He received his first fountain pen related patent in 1889. In 1894 Parker received a patent on his "Lucky Curve" fountain pen feed, which was claimed to draw excess ink back into the pen barrel when the pen was not in use.  The company's first successful pen, released in 1899, was the Parker Jointless. The Lucky Curve feed was used in various forms until 1928.

From the 1920s to the 1960s, before the development of the ballpoint pen, Parker was either number one or number two in worldwide writing instrument sales. In 1931, Parker created Quink (quick drying ink), which eliminated the need for blotting. In 1941, the company developed the most widely used model of fountain pen in history (over $400 million worth of sales in its 30-year history), the Parker 51. Manufacturing facilities were set up over the years in Canada, United Kingdom, Denmark, France, Mexico, USA, Pakistan, India, Germany (Osmia-Parker), Brazil and Argentina.

In 1954 Parker released the Parker Jotter ballpoint pen with its original nylon body and inverted "V" clip. The Jotter would go on to sell over 750 million units during its history. In 1955, the company introduced its Liquid Lead pencil which used liquid graphite to write like a pen.  Unfortunately, the Scripto company had introduced a similar product called Fluidlead a few months previously.  To avoid a costly patent fight the companies agreed to share their formulas with each other.

The company bought retailer and catalog company Norm Thompson in 1973, and then sold it in 1981. In 1976 Parker acquired Manpower just as the temporary staffing market was surging.  In time Manpower provided more revenue than the pen business.  A 1982 spinoff, Sintered Specialties, Inc., became SSI Technologies, a manufacturer of automotive sensors.

A management buyout in 1986, moved the company's headquarters to Newhaven, East Sussex, England, which was the original location of the Valentine Pen Company previously acquired by Parker. In 1993 Parker was purchased by the Gillette Company, which already owned the Paper Mate brand - the best-selling disposable ballpoint. In 2000 Gillette sold its writing instruments division to the company Newell Rubbermaid, whose Sanford Stationery Division became the largest writing instrument manufacturers in the world at that time, simultaneously owning such brand names as Rotring, Sharpie, Reynolds as well as Parker, PaperMate, Waterman, and Liquid Paper.

With commercial competition increasing upon the Parker Jotter's classic metal ink refill cartridge design from low cost generic copies produced in China, as Parker's unique design patent for the cartridge expired, Parker's sales began to be drastically adversely affected. In July 2009 Newell Rubbermaid Inc. in response announced that it had decided to close down the Parker production factory at Newhaven in England with the dismissal of 180 employees from the facility, and relocate production to France. The following month, Newell Rubbermaid Inc. announced that the factory in Janesville, Wisconsin, was also to close the remaining operation there producing Parker Pens (which eliminated a further 153 manufacturing jobs).  The company press release stated: "This decision is a response to structural issues accelerated by market trends and is in no way a reflection on the highly valued work performed by our Janesville employees over the years." Newell Rubbermaid offered 'transitional employment services' along with severance pay in compensation to the dismissed workforce.

Subsequently, Parker has abandoned its traditional retail outlets in North America. While some of its former staple Jotter pens may be found in retailers such as Office Depot, the Parker line has been moved to upscale "luxury" retailers in an abandonment of its former business model of quality manufacture combined with mass market appeal and pricing. With this commercial strategic move Parker also altered its traditional product warranty on its high end pens, changing the former lifetime guarantee to a two-year warranty limitation.

Parker Pen Co. was an aviation pioneer. The interest of Parker Pen Co. about aircraft came from Kenneth Parker, son of the founder, he enlisted in the fledgling air service and, after flight training at Miami Air Base, Kenneth was assigned to officer training in tactical maneuvers at Pensacola Naval Air Station, Florida. From their first company business plane, the Parker Duofold Fairchild, they used it as an innovative advertising weapon inviting his dealers. Between the 1920s and 1960s, Parker maintained a considerable air fleet.

Famous models
Key models in the company's history include:

 Jointless (1899)
 Jack Knife Safety (1909)
 Duofold (1921) 
 Vacumatic (1932) 
 51 (1941) 
 Jotter (1954) 
 61 (1956) 
 45 (1964)
 75 (1964) 
 Classic (1967) 
 25 (1975) 
 180 (1977)
 Arrow (1982) 
 Vector (1986) 
 Duofold International (1987)
 95 (1988) 
 Sonnet (1993) 
 Parker 100 (2004)

Parker 25 
The Parker 25 was a pen introduced by the Parker Pen Company in 1975. Created by the renowned designer Kenneth Grange based on a detailed brief, it was manufactured in Newhaven, England and produced in a variety of different versions until 1999. An eye-catching, contemporary-looking pen, with mainly steel components, the Parker 25 was intended to revive the company's fortunes. As The Guardian wrote, '(Grange's) classic Parker pen had the machined lustre of a bullet. In fact, its tapering barrel was inspired by an American space rocket, a form that enabled the lid to be the same diameter as the pen no matter which end it was attached to.' It was affordable enough to become a staple entry-level pen for both work and leisure uses - and for secondary school students at a time when fountain pens were still obligatory in many British schools. Advertising slogans used to market Parker 25s included 'Modern as Tomorrow', 'Space Age Design, Space Age Performance', 'European Styled' and 'Contemporary, Highly Functional Design'.

Parker 25s were issued in several variants: initially, fountain pen, ballpoint, fibre point and mechanical pencil. A rollerball model was introduced in 1981, and fibre tips were phased out a couple of years later. While the great majority of Parker 25s were 'flighters', with a brushed steel finish, matte black and later white versions were issued between 1978 and 1987. The pens had four different trim colours - blue (the most common), black, green, and most rarely of all, orange. Orange trim Parker 25s were discontinued in 1976 following a copyright dispute with Rotring, and surviving examples are very sought after. A striking feature of all Parker 25s is the square plastic tassie logo on the clip.

The earliest Mark I Parker 25 fountain pens dating from the first year of production feature a distinctive breather hole in the nib. While the original models had a flat plastic circle on top of the cap, Mark III and IV pens have a round ridge on this inner cap. Pens manufactured from 1980 feature letter date codes which were changed every quarter. Those manufactured from 1990 are stamped 'Made in UK'; earlier pens were inscribed 'Made in England'. Pens without any manufacture stamps, or inscribed 'Made in Aust', are very rare. Parker 25s were all assembled in Britain by hand - unlike Jotters, Vectors and other mass market pens - and were very minimalist, comprising between 9 and 11 components.

The 25 was an extremely successful pen for Parker commercially, especially during its first decade or so of production. A number of promotional versions were made up to order, featuring company logos on the barrel (the matte black and white versions were often branded in this way), clip or cap.

Some pen fans are rather disparaging about the Parker 25, which lacks the status of the legendary Parker Duofold or the storied Parker 51. But in recent years they have been enjoying a revival, their space age look evoking nostalgia for the final quarter of the twentieth century. The Parker 25 was even given the accolade of an exhibition stand at the Victoria and Albert Museum.

Parker Vector

The precursor to the Parker Vector was introduced in 1981.  It was a simple cylindrical plastic cap and barrel roller-ball pen called the "Parker RB1". In 1984, Parker added the FP1 ("Fountain Pen 1"), with essentially the same design.  The RB1 and FP1 models were produced until 1986, at which time Parker revised the pen by lengthening the cap and shortening the barrel and renaming the new pen the "Vector Standard".  Presently, there are four models available (in plastic and steel): the fountain pen, capped rollerball, pushbutton ballpoint, and pushbutton pencil.

US Presidential Parkers 

Parker Jotters were a favorite choice of President John F. Kennedy for signing legislation and to give as gifts. Indeed, successive presidents from Kennedy to Clinton used Parker pens for these purposes, and Parker retained a special representative, John W. Gibbs, to handle White House orders. In one of his early years in office, Lyndon Johnson ordered no less than 60,000 Parker pens. LBJ would use up to 75 pens to sign each important document and bill, writing different strokes of the letters of his name with different pens, and giving them all away to allies and supporters with little typed certificates. After Parker ceased to be an American-owned company, later presidents switched to using A. T. Cross Company pens.

Products
Products offered by the Parker Pen Company :

Gallery

See also

 Jointless
 Duofold
 100
 51
 Jotter
 Vacumatic
 Vector
 Quink
 List of pen types, brands and companies

References

External links

 
 Information site for 130 years of Parker pens
 Parker pens gallery on Penhero site
 

British Royal Warrant holders
Fountain pen and ink manufacturers
Manufacturing companies established in 1888
Newell Brands
Pencil brands
Ink brands
Pen manufacturers
1993 mergers and acquisitions
2000 mergers and acquisitions